Time2 is a UK-based multichannel retailer and manufacturer of security cameras, tablets, and smart home devices. The company is based in Blackburn in Lancashire. The company sells WiFi Security Cameras, Home security systems, and smart home devices. 

Time2 is a sister company of eBusiness UK, a digital agency in the North-West of England. The Time2 brand was set up in 2010 with multichannel trading including Amazon UK, eBay UK and its own eCommerce website. In 2014 the brand expanded into Europe through European Amazon platforms as well as deal sites in Ireland and across the continent.

References

Manufacturing companies of the United Kingdom
Consumer electronics retailers of the United Kingdom
Companies based in Blackburn